Dättnau is a quarter in the district 4 of Winterthur.

It was formerly a part of Töss municipality, which was incorporated into Winterthur in 1922.

The quarter has a population of approximately 2,600 (2007).

Winterthur